Carsehall is a village in Perth and Kinross, Scotland. It is northeast of Loch Leven and west of Bishop Hill in the Lomond Hills. It is on the A911 road at its junction with the B919 road. It is the location of the Balgedie Toll Tavern.

References

Villages in Perth and Kinross